Samsung Galaxy Fame is a low-end smartphone by Samsung Electronics which was released in February 2013.  Like all other Samsung Galaxy smartphones, the Galaxy Fame runs on the Android mobile operating system.  The phone features a 3.5 inch HVGA LCD touchscreen.  Depending on the model, the phone can have variants which have dual-MicroSIM or NFC capabilities.  Many users have found the device's capabilities to be basic, seeing it as a low-end smartphone for light users that want some of the functionality of higher end Galaxy devices.

Specifications
The phone follows the candybar form factor for smartphones, and features a plastic exterior.  The Galaxy Fame features an ARM Cortex-A9 1 GHz single-core processor. It has 4GB of internal storage and supports microSD cards up to 64GB.  The device features an accelerometer intended to translate natural gestures into commands on the phone; for example, if the phone is ringing and the user turns it face down, it will mute the incoming call, or if the user wishes to update a Bluetooth or wireless internet connection, they can shake the device and it will automatically update. It also features an embedded NFC chip and S-Beam on certain models, which is usually only found on high-end Galaxy devices.

Variants

NFC model - GT-S6810P
The GT-S6810P is an NFC variant of the Galaxy Fame.

Dual SIM models - GT-S6812/GT-S6812C/GT-S6812i 
The GT-S6812 is a dual SIM variant of the Galaxy Fame. A model for China Unicom (GT-S6812C) has also been released.

Fame Lite S6790
This version features an 850 MHz single-core processor and a 3 megapixel camera.

See also
Samsung Galaxy Ace
Samsung Galaxy Young 2

References 

Android (operating system) devices
Mobile phones introduced in 2013
Galaxy Fame
Samsung smartphones